DWAC may refer to:

 DWAC-FM, a radio station in Naga, Philippines
 DWAC-TV, a television station in Manila, Philippines
 Digital World Acquisition Corporation, a SPAC associated with Trump Media & Technology Group
 Devil Without a Cause, a 1998 album by Kid Rock or its title track